Nares Rocks are a group of three rocks with a total area of 0.76 ha in Bass Strait, part of Tasmania’s Hunter Island Group and lie between north-west Tasmania and King Island.  They are steep and largely bare of vegetation.

Fauna
Breeding seabirds and shorebirds include common diving-petrel, Pacific gull, silver gull, sooty oystercatcher and black-faced cormorant.

References

Islands of North West Tasmania